Regius Professor of Engineering refers to a number of chairs of engineering in the United Kingdom granted the status of Regius Professor by the monarch:

 Regius Professor of Engineering at the University of Cambridge
 Regius Professor of Engineering at the University of Edinburgh
 Regius Professor of Engineering at Imperial College London